is a city located in Niigata Prefecture, Japan. , the city had an estimated population of 189,430, in 76,461 households with a population density of 190 persons per km2. Jōetsu borders the Sea of Japan and is renowned for its abundance of snow, the annual cherry-blossom festival, sake and Koshihikari rice.

Geography

Jōetsu is in southwest Niigata Prefecture, bordered by the Sea of Japan to the north and Nagano Prefecture to the south. It is approximately 133 kilometers west of the city of Niigata, the prefectural capital and 139 kilometers east of Toyama.

Mountains
Surrounded by the Japanese Alps, Jōetsu contains four noteworthy mountains:

Kasugayama - formerly the location of Kasugayama Castle, home of the Sengoku period daimyō, Uesugi Kenshin
Kanayasan - birthplace of skiing in Japan
Yoneyama - a sacred mountain on the border of Joetsu and neighboring Kashiwazaki City.
Hishigatake-yama - part of the Shin-etsu trail and one location of the annual "Candle Road" festival

Although part of neighboring city Myōkō, Mount Myōkō can also be vividly seen from Joetsu. Known for its heavy snowfall and ski resorts, Mt. Myōkō is listed as one of the 100 Famous Japanese Mountains, and is considered the "Mount Fuji of Echigo".

Surrounding municipalities
Niigata Prefecture
Kashiwazaki
Tōkamachi
Itoigawa
Myōkō
Nagano Prefecture
Iiyama
Sakae

Climate
Jōetsu has a humid subtropical climate (Köppen climate classification Cfa). The average annual temperature is 13.4 °C. The average annual rainfall is 2599 mm with January as the wettest month. The temperatures are highest on average in August, at around 26.0 °C, and lowest in January, at around 2.2 °C.

As a comparison, Forks on the windward side of Washington's Olympic Peninsula receives  and Rize on the Black Sea coast of Turkey .

Demographics
Per Japanese census data, the population of Jōetsu has declined over the past 60 years.

Toponymy
The kanji for Jōetsu combines  "upward",  "to surpass" and  "city", which can be misleading as the city is located in the southwestern part of Niigata Prefecture, closer to Toyama and Nagano Prefectures, as opposed to more northern areas in Niigata. Prior to the Meiji Restoration, Echigo Province was divided into three sections. One portion was called , which was translated as "Upper Echigo", due its geographical proximity to the capital city of Kyoto. When referring to Jōetsu, it could refer to the actual geographical Jōetsu region, which encompasses the cities of Jōetsu, Myōkō and Itoigawa, or may simply refer to the city of Jōetsu .

History

The area of present-day Jōetsu has been inhabited for thousands of years, and the ruins of numerous Jōmon period and Kofun period settlements, tombs and fortifications have been found. The area was part of ancient Echigo Province, and the location of the Nara period provincial capital. During the Sengoku period, it was the center of the holdings of the Uesugi clan and notably Kasugayama Castle was the headquarters of the famed warlord Uesugi Kenshin. The Uesugi clan were transferred by Toyotomi Hideyoshi to Aizu and the area later came under the Takada Domain during the Edo period Tokugawa Shogunate.

In 1614, Matsudaira Tadateru, the 6th son of Tokugawa Ieyasu was assigned to Echigo Province and ordered the construction of Takada Castle. The domain was later ruled by a number of fudai daimyō houses. The last daimyō of Takada Domain was Sakakibara Masataka, who sided with the imperial forces in the Boshin War of the Meiji restoration and who subsequently served as imperial governor until the abolition of the han system in 1871 by the Meiji government.

The towns of Takada and Naoetsu were created with the establishment of the modern municipalities system on April 1, 1889. Takada was elevated to city status on September 1, 1911 and Naoetsu on June 1, 1954. Takada and Naoetsu merged to form the city of Jōetsu in 1971.

On January 1, 2005, Jōetsu annexed 13 neighbouring municipalities, expanding its area by four times. The municipalities that were annexed into consisted of the following: the town of Yasuzuka, the villages of Maki, Ōshima and Uragawara (all from Higashikubiki District); the towns of Itakura, Kakizaki, Ōgata and Yoshikawa, and the villages of Kiyosato, Kubiki, Nakagō and Sanwa (all from Nakakubiki District); and the town of and Nadachi (from Nishikubiki District). On April 1, 2007, Jōetsu attained Special city status, which gives it greater local autonomy from the prefectural government.

Skiing in Japan
The victory in the Russo-Japanese War in 1905 brought about newfound interest in Japanese military strategy which prompted European powers to send troops to Japan to study new methods of combat. One of the soldiers, an Austro-Hungarian major named Theodor von Lerch, made a profound difference to the Jōetsu locals as well as the nation itself by introducing the sport of skiing to Japan. On January 12, 1911, Lerch began his ski training on Mt. Kanaya. The participants consisted of both soldiers and civilians. Lerch taught using the “Stemboggen” method, which involved a single bamboo pole that served a dual purpose as a steering tool and as a brake. With the translation help of the IJA 13th Division commander Gaishi Nagaoka, the Takada Ski Club eventually amassed over 6,000 members in 1912. Soon after, skiing spread across the nation, especially in areas where snow dominated the landscape. It provided a new mode of transportation not only for the military, but for those who were rendered immobile by the seemingly impassible slopes of white. To commemorate his contribution, the Japan Ski Origins Museum was erected on Mt. Kanaya in time to coincide with the 80th anniversary of skiing's inception in Japan.

World War II
During World War II, the city of Naoetsu was the site of a POW camp that garnered international focus from the best-selling biography, Unbroken: A World War II Story of Survival, Resilience, and Redemption by Laura Hillenbrand and later, the movie adaptation, "Unbroken" in 2014. The book and movie focus on former Olympic track star Louis Zamperini and the brutal mistreatment of him and his fellow soldiers at the hands of the Imperial Japanese Army corporal, Mutsuhiro Watanabe, infamously known as "The Bird". According to the book, Watanabe fled Naoetsu after the Allied forces invaded Japan and was never charged, despite being one of General Douglas MacArthur's top 40 most-wanted war criminals.

The Naoetsu POW camp also housed over 300 Australian soldiers, 60 of which died from sickness and poor living conditions. In October 1995, fifty years following the end of the war, the Peace Memorial Park and Peace Statues were founded and built by Jōetsu to promote peace and friendship. The following year, the Japan-Australia Society of Jōetsu was established with the purpose of educating future generations and maintaining a lasting relationship with Australian citizens abroad and living throughout Joetsu.

Government

Jōetsu has a mayor-council form of government with a directly elected mayor and a unicameral city legislature of 32 members. The city contributes five members to the Niigata Prefectural Assembly. In terms of national politics, the city is part of the Niigata at-large district in the upper house of the National Diet of Japan, and Niigata 6th District in the lower house.

Economy
Jōetsu is a regional commercial and industrial centre, with heavy industry concentrated around the port of former Naoetsu, and light manufacturing and commerce around the former Takada area. The Jōetsu Thermal Power Station is an LNG-fired thermal power station operated by JERA in the city.

Education

Colleges and universities
Joetsu University of Education is a national university established on October 1, 1978, and specializes in pedagogical training for prospective roles in elementary and secondary education, as well as a focus on child growth and development. Although the university accepts international students, the admission rate hovers between 20 and 30%, making it a selective institution.
Niigata College of Nursing
Niigata Junior College of Nursing

Primary and secondary education
Jōetsu has 50 public elementary schools and 22 public junior high schools operated by the city government, one public elementary school and one junior high school operated by the national government. The city has eight public high schools, Joetsu High School and Sekine Gakuen High School, operated by the Niigata Prefectural Board of Education and two private high schools. The prefecture also operates four special education schools.

Transportation

Railway
 – Hokuriku Shinkansen

 JR East - Shin'etsu Main Line
 -  -  -  -  -  - 
 Hokuetsu Express Hokuhoku Line
 -  -  -  - 
 Echigo Tokimeki Railway - Myōkō Haneuma Line
 -<  -  > -  -  -  -  - 
 Echigo Tokimeki Railway - Nihonkai Hisui Line
Nadachi - Arimagawa - Tanihama - Naoetsu

Highway
 Hokuriku Expressway 
 Jōshin-etsu Expressway

Ferry

The port of Ogi, on Sado Island, can be accessed by a jetfoil that runs 1-3 times a day from March 1 until November 15.

Local attractions

Places of Interest

Takada Castle: Three-story turret located in Takada Park
Kasugayama Castle: A castle ruin, main castle of Uesugi clan
Samegao Castle : A castle ruin of Uesugi clan.
Hida Sites, Yayoi period settlement ruins, National Historic Site
Takahashi Magozaemon Shouten: oldest running candy store in Japan 
Joetsu Aquarium Umigatari
Iwanohara Vineyard Co., Ltd.: one of the oldest wineries in Japan and birthplace of the grape Muscat Bailey A
Gangi Dori: 16 km alleyway of wooden eaves built to shelter pedestrians during heavy snowfall
Izumi Jomon Park: home to ruins from Japan's Jōmon Period

Cultural Events
Takada Castle Million-Visitor Cherry Blossom Festival
Joetsu Lotus Festival
Joetsu Festival
Kenshin Festival
Echigo Kenshin Sake Festival
Lerch Festival
Candle Road

Sister city relations
 - Lilienfeld, Austria
 - Pohang, North Gyeongsang, South Korea
 - Hunchun, Yanbian Korean Autonomous Prefecture, Jilin, China

Notable people from Jōetsu
Kenkichi Yoshizawa, diplomat
Maejima Hisoka,  politician, businessman, founder of the Japanese Postal System
Nana Haruta, manga artist
Nobutaka Tsutsui, politician
Ogawa Mimei, children's writer
Kawakami Zenbei, winemaker, founder of Iwanohara Vineyard
Uesugi Kenshin, daimyō

References

Further reading

External links

Official Website 
Jōetsu Tourism Promotion Division

 
Cities in Niigata Prefecture
Port settlements in Japan
Populated coastal places in Japan